Aeromonas diversa is a Gram-negative, facultative anaerobic bacterium of the genus Aeromonas isolated from the leg wound of a patient in New Orleans.

References

External links
Type strain of Aeromonas diversa at BacDive -  the Bacterial Diversity Metadatabase

Aeromonadales
Bacteria described in 2010